The 1987 Pittsburgh Gladiators season was the first season for the Gladiators. They finished 4–2 and lost a 45–16 game against the Denver Dynamite in ArenaBowl I.

Regular season

Schedule

Standings

y – clinched regular-season title

x – clinched playoff spot

Playoffs

Roster

Stats

Offense

Quarterback

Running backs

Wide receivers

Defense

Special teams

Kick return

Kicking

Awards

References

External links
 1987 Pittsburgh Gladiators season at arenafan.com

Pittsburgh Gladiators
Tampa Bay Storm seasons
Pittsburgh Gladiators